The England national cricket team toured New Zealand in February and March 1959 and played a two-match Test series against the New Zealand national cricket team. England won the series 1–0 with one match drawn.

Test series summary

First Test

Second Test

References

1959 in English cricket
1959 in New Zealand cricket
New Zealand cricket seasons from 1945–46 to 1969–70
1958-59
International cricket competitions from 1945–46 to 1960